The 2020–21 Biathlon World Cup – Stage 1 was the opening event of the season and is held in Kontiolahti, Finland, from 28 to 29 November 2020.

Schedule of events 
The events took place at the following times.

Medal winners

Men

Women

References 

Biathlon World Cup - Stage 1, 2020-21
2020–21 Biathlon World Cup
Biathlon competitions in Finland
Biathlon World Cup